Jan Wayne ( (born Jan Christiansen, January 1974, Husum, Schleswig-Holstein) is a German electronic dance music DJ and producer.

Discography

Albums
2002 - Back Again
2003 - Gonna Move Ya

Singles
2001 - "Total Eclipse of the Heart" - UK #28 (in 2003)
2002 - "Because the Night" - UK #14
2002 - "Only You" (Cover of Yazoo's song)
2002 - "More Than a Feeling"
2003 - "Love Is a Soldier"
2003 - "1,2,3 (Keep the Spirit Alive)"
2004 - "Here I Am (Send Me an Angel)"
2005 - "Mad World"
2006 - "Time to Fly"
2006 - "All Over the World"
2007 - "Time Stood Still"
2007 - "I Touch Myself"
2007 - "She's Like the Wind"
2008 - "Numb" / "Numb Remixes" / "Numb - The New Mixes" - Jan Wayne vs. Raindropz!
2009 - "Wherever You Will Go" (Cover of The Calling's Song)
2010 - "L Amour Toujours" (WEB) / Jan Wayne Presents Marco Lovei and DVZ
2011 - "Run To You"
2011 - "Bring Me To Life"
2012 - "Free Fallin"

References

External links
Official Site

1974 births
Living people
People from Husum
German DJs
German electronic musicians
Electronic dance music DJs